The Narrow Cape Formation is a geologic formation in the Kodiak Archipelago, in Alaska. The formation outcrops along Narrow Cape and nearby Ugak Island. It preserves fossils dating back to the Neogene period. Invertebrate fossils are abundant, along with rare vertebrate fossils.

See also

 List of fossiliferous stratigraphic units in Alaska
 Paleontology in Alaska

References

 
 

Neogene Alaska